Sīļukalns Parish is an administrative unit of Preiļi Municipality in the Latgale region of Latvia. At the beginning of 2014, the population of the parish was 569. The administrative center is Sīļukalns village.

Towns, villages and settlements of Sīļukalns parish 
 Brokas
 Grozu Bernāni
 Kapenieki
 Opolie
 Sīļukalns
 Sondori
 Sprukstiņi
 Stikāni
 Teilāni
 Upenieki

References 

Parishes of Latvia
Preiļi Municipality
Latgale